Arnd Krüger  (born July 1, 1944) is a German professor of sport studies.  Krüger earned his BA (English major) from UCLA in 1967 and his PhD from the University of Cologne (Modern and Medieval History) in Germany in 1971.  He attended UCLA on a track scholarship, was 10 times German champion, and represented West Germany at the 1968 Summer Olympics in the 1500 metres run, where he reached the semi-final. He was one of the first Germans to be honored as All-American for being part of the UCLA Distance Medley Relay which ran faster than the World Record in 1965.

After completing the PhD,  Krüger worked for the German Sports Federation (1971–74), and the Berlin Teachers' Training College (1974–78) and taught part-time at the German National Coaching Academy.  He was Associate Professor for Coaching and Movement Sciences at the University of Hamburg (1978–80) and then became full professor for Sport Studies and Chair of the Physical Education Department at the University of Göttingen and was head of the Society and Training Section. He has served several times as Dean of the School of Social Sciences in Göttingen.

Krüger was the founding president of the European committee for sports history (1995–97).  and has been the President of the Niedersächsisches Institut für Sportgeschichte (Lower Saxony Institute for Sport History). from 2000 to 2018. He is an International Fellow of the American National Academy of Kinesiology (only the ninth German to be so honored). He is the author/editor of more than 40 books and has been published in 15 languages. He has guided 60 PhD and over 300 M.A. theses and was guest professor in Mexico and Japan. In 1985 he founded one of the first sports kindergartens which still exists. The WorldCat has 409 works of/about him.
In 2012 he received the Human Resources Award for innovative health management of the Deutsche Verband für Gesundheitssport und Sporttherapie and the Fraunhofer-Gesellschaft for their successful Core training programme of forest workers. He was honored by an international Festschrift at the occasion of his 65th birthday (2009) and received the prestigious Bernhard-Zimmermann-Medal for his merits for sport history in 2016.

Books
 (1972) Die Olympischen Spiele 1936 und die Weltmeinung: ihre außenpolitische Bedeutung unter besonderer Berücksichtigung der USA. Berlin: Bartels & Wernitz, 1972. 
 (1975) Sport und Politik: von Turnvater Jahn zum Staatsamateur. Hannover: Fackelträger. 
 (1975) Theodor Lewald : Sportführer ins Dritte Reich. Berlin: Bartels & Wernitz. 
 with Oberdieck, Helmut. (1978) Guide to Track & Field Injuries Los Altos, CA: Tafnews. 
 (1979) with Dieter Niedlich: Ursachen der Schulsport-Misere in Deutschland: Festschrift für Professor Konrad Paschen. London: Arena Publ. 
 (1980) Das Berufsbild des Trainers im Sport. International vergleichende Studie und Perspektiven der Traineraus- und -   weiterbildung in der Bundesrepublik Deutschland Schorndorf: Hofmann. 
 (1981) Sport und Gesellschaft Berlin: Tischler. 
 (1984) with John McClelland (eds.). Die Anfänge des modernen Sports in der Renaissance. London : Arena Publ. 
 with Niedlich, Dieter 200 Neue Basketball-Drills 1 edition.  Schorndorf: Hofmann, 1982, new editions 1991, 1996, 2001. 
 with Gebauer, Susanne. (1995) Informationseinrichtungen im Sport. Eine Erhebung in Deutschland, Österreich und der Schweiz Cologne: Sport und Buch Strauss. 
 with Oberdieck, Helmut; Sturm, Manfred. (1986) Ratgeber für Leichtathletikverletzungen Berlin: Tischler. 
 with Niedlich, Dieter. (1985) 100 Ballspiel-Fertigkeitstests Schorndorf: Hofmann. 
 (1985) (ed.). Leibesübungen in Europa. Die Europäische Gemeinschaft. London: Arena Publ. 
 with Else Trangbæk (eds.): The History of Physical Education and Sport from European Perspectives. Kopenhagen: University of Copenhagen 1999. 
 with Else Trangbæk (1999)(eds.). Gender & sport from European perspectives. Copenhagen : CESH. 
 with Murray, William. (2003)The Nazi Olympics: sport, politics and appeasement in the 1930s Urbana: University of Illinois Press, 
 with Riordan, James (2003). European cultures of sport: examining the nations and regions. Bristol: Intellect. 
 with Riordan, James (1999). The international politics of sport in the twentieth century. London: Routledge. 
 with Riordan, James (1996). The story of worker sport. Champaign, Ill.: Human Kinetics. 
 with Carter, John M. (1990). Ritual and record: sports records and quantification in pre-modern societies.  Westport, Conn:    Greenwood. 
 with McClelland, John (1984). Die Anfänge des modernen Sports in der Renaissance. London: Arena Publ. 
 with Bernd Wedemeyer-Kolwe (eds.)(2009). Vergessen, verdrängt, abgelehnt: zur Geschichte der Ausgrenzung im Sport. Berlin: Lit. 
 With Roland Naul (eds.)(2009). Kulturen des Jugendsports : Bildung, Erziehung und Gesundheit.  Aachen: Meyer & Meyer. 
 with Susan Bandy, Annette Hofmann (eds.): Gender, Body and Sport in Historical and Transnational Perspectives. Festschrift für Gigliola Gori. Hamburg: Dr. Kovac 2007, .
 with Angela Teja, Jean François Loudcher, Teresa Gonzalez Aja, Maria Mercedes Palandri (Hrsg.): Corpo e senso del limite. Sport and a sense of the body’s limits. Hannover: Niedersächsisches Inst. für    Sportgeschichte 2014. .
 With Swantje Scharenberg (eds.) (2014). Zeiten für Helden – Zeiten für Berühmtheiten im Sport. Münster: LIT. 
 Grenzüberschreitung: Sport neu denken. Festschrift zum 65. Geburtstag von Prof. Dr. Arnd Krüger. Swantje Scharenberg, Bernd Wedemeyer-Kolwe, editors. Hoya: Niedersächsisches Inst. für Sportgeschichte, 2009. .

References

 Beschluss des dvs-Präsidiums: Öffentliche Rüge für Professor Dr. Arnd Krüger http://www.sportwissenschaft.de/index.php?id=1007

External links 
 

1944 births
Living people
Sports historians
Academic staff of the University of Hamburg
Academic staff of the University of Göttingen
University of California, Los Angeles alumni
University of Cologne alumni
Olympic athletes of West Germany
20th-century German historians
German national athletics champions
German male middle-distance runners
West German male middle-distance runners
Athletes (track and field) at the 1968 Summer Olympics
21st-century German historians